Calvo Sotelo de Puertollano Club de Fútbol (or CS Puertollano) is a Spanish football team located in Puertollano, Ciudad Real, in the autonomous community of Castilla–La Mancha. Founded in 2015, it currently plays in Segunda División RFEF – Group 5, holding home matches at Estadio Ciudad de Puertollano with a capacity of 7,240 spectators.

History 
The club was founded in June 2015, right upon the dissolution of other local club, CD Puertollano. Máximo Saez became its first president.

Season to season

1 season in Segunda División RFEF
3 seasons in Tercera División

References 

Football clubs in Castilla–La Mancha
Association football clubs established in 2015
Divisiones Regionales de Fútbol clubs
2015 establishments in Spain
Puertollano